Union Bank Plaza is a 40-story,  office skyscraper located on South Figueroa Street in Downtown Los Angeles, California.

History 
Construction of the building began in 1965 and was completed in 1968. It is currently the 22nd tallest building in Los Angeles. It was the first skyscraper to be built as part of the Bunker Hill Redevelopment Project. It was built in the International style, a popular way of designing buildings at the time. The complex was named a Los Angeles historic cultural monument in 2020.  The building uses induction units for HVAC.

Union Bank Plaza was featured in an episode of Tots TV when the Tots went to America.

See also
Aquarius (sculpture), installed outside the building
List of tallest buildings in Los Angeles

References

Further reading

External links
 

Bank buildings in California
Bunker Hill, Los Angeles
Hines Interests Limited Partnership
International style architecture in California
Office buildings completed in 1968
Skyscraper office buildings in Los Angeles